Clarita "Claire" Crisostomo dela Fuente-de Guzman (December 28, 1958 – March 30, 2021) was a Filipina singer. She achieved celebrity status in the late 1970s with the jukebox hit "Sayang" and was given the title "Asia's Sweetest Voice" because of her singing style. She was dubbed "the Karen Carpenter of the Philippines" because of her contralto's resemblance to that of Carpenter's. Her first album in 1978 was then the Philippines' biggest seller at the time of release. She went on to record seven more albums. Besides "Sayang", she was also known for hits like "Minsan-Minsan" and "Nakaw na Pag-ibig".

She was given the title "Queen of Tagalog Songs" alongside Rico J. Puno as her counterpart. She was also named "Jukebox Queen" together with her contemporaries Imelda Papin, Eva Eugenio and Didith Reyes, and was also dubbed as "Asia's Sweetest Voice". She was a contralto.

She was also a successful businesswoman. She was the president of the Integrated Metropolitan Bus Operators Association (IMBOA), though her bus franchise was cancelled in 2011 for joining a nationwide transport strike.

In 1977, she teamed up with Eddie Rodriguez who wrote the song "Halik Sa Paa, Halik Sa Kamay" for an upcoming film starring Eddie Rodriguez and Vilma Santos.

Biography

Dela Fuente was 15 when she won the grand prize in the first singing contest she joined, singing The Carpenters' "Love Me for What I Am". By that time, the Accounting freshman at the University of the East knew she loved singing and was aware that she sounded like Karen Carpenter after a high school classmate had pointed it out.

Composer George Canseco, a fellow UE Alumni, and the head judge in the contest, gave the singer her first break by having her sing the jingle in a Hope cigarette commercial that became popular for its "imported" sound.

Dela Fuente left show business in her mid-20s after reaping its financial rewards. She was married by that time, having tied the knot at 19 to a man 10 years her senior. In 1993, she set up the King of Kings Transport, which had to fold up a few years later, not turning out to be the lucrative business she had hoped it would be.

Six years later, dela Fuente was elected president of the Integrated Metro Bus Operators Association (IMBOA), whose members make up 70 percent of all bus operators in Metro Manila. In 2003, she made headlines when she spearheaded a boycott of the color-coding scheme that the MMDA had imposed for a week on all public utility vehicles as part of a traffic experiment. The move put her at odds with the equally headstrong MMDA Chairman Bayani Fernando.

In 2003, dela Fuente went back to school to study transportation management at PUP then went ahead and finished a master's degree in Business Administration at the University of Western Australia in 2005.

In 2016, she became a Doctor of Naturopathic Medicine having finished her degree from University of Makati.  She studied this type of alternative medicine to be able to help people who are ill.

Besides being the spokesperson of the entire public transportation industry, she became a very successful businesswoman. She dabbled into the cosmetics industry, opening up The Skin Shop. Alongside this, she showcased her flair for culinary arts and opened Gracielo's and Claire dela Fuente Seafood and Grill.

In December 2006, her husband and best friend for more than 28 years, Moises (Boy) de Guzman, died after a five-month struggle with cancer. He was survived by dela Fuente and their two sons, Gregorio (Gigo; born 1986) and Gracielo (Mickey; born 1991).

In 2008, she teamed up with Richard Carpenter for her international album Something in Your Eyes.

In 2010, she recorded a duet with Michael Bolton, "The Christmas Song". The duet was included on her The Christmas Album under Viva Records.

Death 
Dela Fuente died on the morning of March 30, 2021, at the age of 62, due to cardiac arrest arising from complications of COVID-19. She was admitted to the Pope John Paul II Hospital and Medical Center in Las Piñas, where she had been hospitalized after testing positive for COVID-19.

Discography

Albums

Studio albums

Compilation albums

Singles
 "Baliw"
 "'Di Magbabago"
 "Ibulong Mo Sa Hangin"
 "Ikaw ang Simula"
 "Kailangan Ko'y Ikaw"
 "Makikita Mo"
 "Marupok Ka Man"
 "Mga Bulong ng Pag-Ibig"
 "Mga Nakaw na Sandali"
 "Minsan Minsan"
 "Nakaw na Pag-Ibig"
 "Nangingiti ang Puso Ko"
 "Pag-Ibig Mo... Langit Ko"
 "Sa Dulo ng Landas"
 "Something in Your Eyes"
 "Sayang"
 "Unang Pag-Ibig"

References

External links
 De la Fuente is RP's 'Karen Carpenter'
 SPECIAL REPORT: Shattering the glass ceiling

1958 births
2021 deaths
Deaths from the COVID-19 pandemic in the Philippines
20th-century Filipino businesspeople
Filipino women pop singers
Filipino women in business
Intercontinental Broadcasting Corporation personalities
Singers from Metro Manila
University of the East alumni
Viva Records (Philippines) artists
20th-century Filipino women singers
21st-century Filipino women singers
20th-century businesswomen
21st-century businesswomen